Eznaveleh or Eznavleh or Aznavleh or Aznavaleh or Aznauleh may refer to:
 Eznaveleh, Hamadan
 Aznavleh, Isfahan